Maureen Madden is a Democratic member of the Pennsylvania House of Representatives, serving since 2017.

Madden currently sits on the Education, Gaming Oversight, Human Services, and State Government committees.

Education 
Madden has a bachelor's degree in political science from Marymount Manhattan College and a master's degree in communication from Marywood University.

Electoral history

References

Year of birth missing (living people)
Living people
Democratic Party members of the Pennsylvania House of Representatives
People from Monroe County, Pennsylvania
21st-century American politicians